The 54th Uddeholm Swedish Rally, the second round of the 2005 World Rally Championship season took place from February 11–13, 2005.

Results

Retirements

  Sébastien Loeb - engine (SS19)
  Marcus Grönholm - accident (SS16)
  Mikko Hirvonen - electrical (SS18)

Special stages
All dates and times are CET (UTC+1).

Championship standings after the event

Drivers' championship

External links
 Results at eWRC.com

Sweden
2005
Rally